Ali Helichi is an Iranian football defender who currently plays for Iranian football club Sanat Naft Abadan in the Persian Gulf Pro League.

Club career
Helichi joined Esteghlal Ahvaz in summer 2014. He made his professional debut against Gostaresh Foolad on September 26, 2015 as a substitute for Armin Mirdoraghi.

Club career statistics

References

External links
 Ali Helichi at IranLeague.ir

1995 births
Living people
Iranian footballers
Esteghlal Ahvaz players
Association football defenders
People from Ahvaz
Sportspeople from Khuzestan province